Amanita arkansana or Becker's ringless amanita is a species of Amanita from South Eastern United States.

References

External links
 
 

arkansana